Gas Interconnector Greece–Bulgaria is a natural gas pipeline from the Greek to the Bulgarian natural gas pipeline network. It became operational on 1 October 2022.

Route
On 14 July 2009, Bulgarian Energy Holding signed an agreement with DEPA and Edison S.p.A. on setting up a company to construct and operate the branch pipeline Interconnector Greece-Bulgaria with capacity of one billion cubic meters of gas per year. The pipeline will be  between Komotini and Stara Zagora in Bulgaria.

The capacity of the pipeline is to be  with reverse flow capability.

Purpose

The project is in line with the joint EU strategy for market-based security of supply, which calls for bidirectional interconnection of national grids and specifically for creation of a Southern Gas Corridor. Whereas the capacity of the gas interconnector project does not fully satisfy the capacity expected in the Southern Gas Corridor, it achieves diversification of sources of supply of natural gas to Bulgaria and helps the countries in the region get greater access to the global natural gas market; Azerbaijani natural gas has started to pass thorough the interconnector.

Project development
On 14 July 2009, a Memorandum of understanding was signed between Bulgarian Energy Holding EAD, Edison (Italy) and DEPA, which defines the principles for development and realization of the project. In January 2011, a joint company "ICGB" AD was registered by the same partners that will construct, own and operate the pipeline. The project took off in 2017. Construction works commenced in early 2020 and was completed in the third quarter of 2022.  The interconnector is fully operational since October 1.

See also

 Energy in the European Union
 Energy in Greece
 Energy in Bulgaria

References

External links
 

Natural gas pipelines in Bulgaria
Natural gas pipelines in Greece
Proposed pipelines in Europe
Bulgaria–Greece relations